The Kuta Reh massacre was committed by the Royal Netherlands East Indies Army (KNIL) on 14 June 1904 in present-day Kuta Rih, Aceh during the Aceh War. Troops of the Korps Marechaussee te voet under general G.C.E. van Daalen defeated the defenders of the fortified village and massacred most of its inhabitants.

Attack and massacre
The Alas villagers of the kampung Kuta Reh had decided not to surrender after the Dutch annexation of the Aceh Sultanate in 1903. They only had an earthen wall and 75 old-fashioned muzzleloaders for defense. Van Daalen, who was accustomed to using a 'complete surrender or complete death' tactic, ordered the village to be attacked. In the ensuing massacre, 313 men, 189 women and 59 children were shot dead. Two of the Dutch attackers were also killed. About the attack, adjutant J.C.J. Kempees wrote later that year:

The entire attack lasted no more than an hour and a half. Van Daalen had himself photographed to celebrate the victory.

Aftermath
Outrage over the Kuta Reh massacre and a visit of mayor Ed van Thijn to Indonesia under Suharto contributed to the September 1984 bombing of the Van Heutsz Monument in Amsterdam, the Netherlands.

See also
 South Sulawesi campaign of 1946–1947
 Rawagede massacre
 Rengat massacre

References

1904 murders in Asia
Aceh War
Dutch conquest of Indonesia
1900s in the Dutch East Indies
Dutch war crimes
History of Aceh
June 1904 events
Massacres in 1904
1904 in the Dutch East Indies